Dendrocnide cordata, the stinger, is a species of flowering plant in the nettle family Urticaceae, native to the Bismarck Archipelago, the Lesser Sunda Islands, New Guinea, and Queensland. It is a rainforest tree reaching , with irritating hairs on its large leaves.

References

cordata
Flora of the Lesser Sunda Islands
Flora of New Guinea
Flora of the Bismarck Archipelago
Flora of Queensland
Plants described in 1965